Pat Malcon (born 2 April 1947) is a New Zealand cricketer. He played in two first-class matches for Wellington in 1972/73. In April 2018, he won the Bert Sutcliffe Medal for Outstanding Services to Cricket at the New Zealand Cricket Awards.

See also
 List of Wellington representative cricketers

References

External links
 

1947 births
Living people
New Zealand cricketers
Place of birth missing (living people)
Wellington cricketers